Mount Diablo (disambiguation) may refer to:
 Mount Diablo, a mountain in Contra Costa County, California.
 Devils Peak (Santa Barbara County, California), a peak on Santa Cruz Island.